The Jacob Woodruff House is a two-story octagonal house constructed of concrete walls, featuring a large, windowed cupola, and metal roof. It is located in Ripon in the U.S. state of Wisconsin, and is listed on the National Register of Historic Places. Jacob Woodruff was a member of and the librarian for the Wisconsin Phalanx in 1846, a communal society based on the philosophy of Charles Fourier, a French socialist.

References

Houses in Fond du Lac County, Wisconsin
Houses completed in 1850
Houses on the National Register of Historic Places in Wisconsin
Octagon houses in Wisconsin
Ripon, Wisconsin
National Register of Historic Places in Fond du Lac County, Wisconsin
Architecture related to utopias